Nishitakao Dam is a rockfill dam located in Tottori prefecture in Japan. The dam is used for irrigation. The catchment area of the dam is 27.2 km2. The dam impounds about 14  ha of land when full and can store 2010 thousand cubic meters of water. The construction of the dam was started on 1979 and completed in 1992.

References

Dams in Tottori Prefecture
1992 establishments in Japan